Frédéric Chagnon (born November 20, 1992) is a professional Canadian football linebacker for the Montreal Alouettes of the Canadian Football League (CFL).

University career
Chagnon played U Sports football with the Montreal Carabins where he was a member of the 50th Vanier Cup championship team.

Professional career

BC Lions
Chagnon was selected in the third round and 24th overall by the BC Lions in the 2017 CFL Draft and signed with the team on May 23, 2017. He played for the Lions for three years where he appeared in 51 regular season games, recording 26 special teams tackles over his tenure with the team. He became a free agent on February 11, 2020 upon the expiration of his rookie contract.

Montreal Alouettes
Chagnon joined the Montreal Alouettes as a free agent on February 12, 2020. However, he did not play in 2020 due to the cancellation of the 2020 CFL season and he was released on July 22, 2021.

Ottawa Redblacks
On July 26, 2021, it was announced that Chagnon had been signed by the Ottawa Redblacks. He scored his first career touchdown following a blocked punt on October 6, 2021 against the Toronto Argonauts. He played in all 14 regular season games where he had one defensive tackle and six special teams tackles while also filling in as a long snapper. He became a free agent upon the expiry of his contract on February 8, 2022.

Montreal Alouettes (II)
On February 8, 2022, it was announced that Chagnon had re-signed with the Montreal Alouettes. He began the 2022 season on the practice roster, but made his Alouettes debut in Week 3 after fellow linebacker Chris Ackie was moved to the injured list. He played in 16 regular season games where he had six special teams tackles.

References

External links
 Montreal Alouettes profile

1992 births
Living people
BC Lions players
Canadian football linebackers
Montreal Alouettes players
Montreal Carabins football players
Ottawa Redblacks players
Players of Canadian football from Quebec
Canadian football people from Montreal